The 2014 United States House of Representatives elections in New York were held on Tuesday, November 4, 2014 to elect the 27 U.S. representatives from the state of New York, one from each of the state's 27 congressional districts. The elections coincided with other elections to the United States Senate and House of Representatives and various state and local elections, including the Governor of New York, Attorney General of New York, and Comptroller of New York.

Overview

By district
Results of the 2014 United States House of Representatives elections in New York by district:

District 1

The 1st district was located in eastern Long Island and includes most of central and eastern Suffolk County. The incumbent was Democrat Tim Bishop, who had represented the district since 2003. He was re-elected with 52% of the vote in 2012, and the district had a PVI of R+2.

Bishop ran for re-election and received the Democratic, Independence, and Working Families nominations. County Republican committees designated State Senator Lee Zeldin, who was the nominee for the seat in 2008, as their nominee. On June 24, 2014, Zeldin defeated former prosecutor George Demos, who had challenged him in a primary.

Republican primary

General election

Polling

Results

District 2

The 2nd district was based along the South Shore of Long Island and includes southwestern Suffolk County and a small portion of southeastern Nassau County. The incumbent was Republican Peter T. King, who had represented the district since 2013 and had previously represented the 3rd district from 1993 to 2013. He was re-elected with 59% of the vote in 2012. The district had a PVI of R+1.

King received the Republican, Conservative and Independence Party nominations. Nassau County District Attorney Kathleen Rice was a potential Democratic candidate, but chose to run in the neighboring 4th district instead. Civic Association President and former health-care executive Patricia Maher received the Democratic nomination. William D. Stevenson received the Green nomination.

General election

Results

District 3

The 3rd district included most of the North Shore of Long Island. It extended from northwestern Suffolk County across northern Nassau County and into far northeastern Queens. The incumbent was Democrat Steve Israel, who had represented the district since 2013 and previously represented the 2nd district from 2001 to 2013. He was re-elected with 58% of the vote in 2012. The district had an even PVI.

Like King in the neighboring 2nd district, Israel had consistently performed well despite his district's swing nature. He has received the Democratic, Independence and Working Families nominations. Attorney Grant Lally, who was the nominee for the 5th district in 1994 and 1996, received the Republican and Conservative nominations.

Republican primary

General election

Results

District 4

The 4th district was located in central and southern Nassau County. The incumbent was Democrat Carolyn McCarthy, who had represented the district since 1997. She was re-elected with 62% of the vote in 2012. The district had a PVI of D+3.

Democratic primary
On January 8, 2014, McCarthy announced that she would not seek re-election due to complications from lung cancer. Nassau County District Attorney Kathleen Rice was endorsed by McCarthy and by the Democratic and Working Families Parties.

Results

Republican primary
Attorney Frank Scaturro, who lost the Republican primary for the seat in 2010 and 2012 and was the Conservative Party nominee in 2012, received the Conservative Party nomination, but dropped out of the race. Former Nassau County Legislative Majority Leader and Presiding Officer Bruce Blakeman, who was the Republican nominee for New York State Comptroller in 1998 and the Tax Revolt Party nominee for the U.S. Senate in 2010, received the Republican, Conservative and Independence Party nominations. Republican Nassau Legislator and nominee for the seat in 2010 and 2012 Fran Becker and Hempstead Town Supervisor Kate Murray considered running, but did not run.

Results

Conservative primary

General election

Polling

Results

District 5

The 5th district was mostly located within Queens in New York City, but also included a small portion of Nassau County. The incumbent was Democrat Gregory Meeks, who had represented the district since 2013 and previously represented the 6th district from 1998 to 2013. He was re-elected in 2012 with 90% of the vote. The district had a PVI of D+35.

Joseph Marthone, who ran against Meeks in the primary in 2012, ran against Meeks again, but lost the primary. Meeks ran unopposed for re-election. Meeks also received the Working Families Party nomination.

Democratic primary

General election

Results

District 6

The 6th district is located entirely within Queens in New York City. The incumbent is Democrat Grace Meng, who has represented the district since 2013. She was elected in 2012, winning the Democratic primary with 53% of the vote and the general election with 68% of the vote. The district has a PVI of D+13.

John Liu, the former New York City Comptroller and a candidate for Mayor of New York City in 2013, had considered challenging Meng in the primary. However, he decided against it (instead opting to run for New York State Senate) and endorsed her for re-election. She has received the Democratic and Working Families nominations and is unopposed for re-election.

General election

Results

District 7

The 7th district is located entirely in New York City and includes parts of Brooklyn, Queens, and Manhattan. The incumbent is Democrat Nydia Velázquez, who has represented the district since 2013, and previously represented the 12th district from 1993 to 2013. She was re-elected in 2012 with 95% of the vote and the district has a PVI of D+34.

Velázquez has received the nomination of the Working Families Party and Attorney Jeff Kurzon is challenging her in the Democratic primary. John Liu, the former New York City Comptroller and a candidate for Mayor of New York City in 2013, also considered challenging Velázquez in the primary; but he decided not to run. Allan E. Romaguera has received the Conservative nomination and Jose Luis Fernandez has received the Republican nomination.

Democratic primary

General election

Results

District 8

The 8th district is located entirely in the New York City boroughs of Brooklyn and Queens. The incumbent is Democrat Hakeem Jeffries, who has represented the district since 2013. He was elected in 2012, winning the Democratic primary with 71% of the vote and the general election with 90% of the vote, succeeding retiring Democrat Edolphus Towns. The district has a PVI of D+35.

Jeffries has received the Democratic and Working Families nominations. Businessman Alan Bellone, a Republican nominee for the State Assembly in 2008 and 2010 and a candidate for the district in 2012, has received the Republican nomination.

General election

Results

District 9

The 9th district is located entirely within the New York City borough of Brooklyn. The incumbent is Democrat Yvette Clarke, who has represented the district since 2013 and previously represented the 11th district from 2007 to 2013. She was re-elected in 2012 with 87% of the vote and the district has a PVI of D+32.

Clarke has received the Democratic and Working Families nominations. Daniel J. Cavanagh, the Republican nominee for the seat in 2012, has received the Conservative Party nomination.

General election

Results

District 10

The 10th district is located in New York City and includes the Upper West Side of Manhattan, the west side of Lower Manhattan, including Greenwich Village and the Financial District, and parts of Brooklyn, including Borough Park. The incumbent is Democrat Jerrold Nadler, who has represented the district since 2013 and previously represented the 8th district from 1993 to 2013 and the 17th district from 1992 to 1993. He was re-elected in 2012 with 90% of the vote and the district has a PVI of D+23.

Nadler has received the Democratic and Working Families nominations. Lolita M. Ferrin has received the Independence Party nomination and Ross Brady, a former Republican nominee for the State Assembly and former Conservative nominee for the state senate and the State Supreme Court, has received the Conservative Party nomination.

General election

Results

District 11

The 11th district is located entirely in New York City and includes all of Staten Island and parts of southern Brooklyn. The incumbent is Republican Michael Grimm, who has represented the district since 2011. He was elected in 2010, defeating incumbent Democrat Michael McMahon with 51% of the vote. The district has a PVI of R+2.

Grimm, who has been indicted on charges including mail fraud and wire fraud due to ongoing campaign finance investigations from his successful run for the 13th district in 2010, has received the Republican, Conservative and Independence Party nominations. The only way he can be removed from the ballot is by moving out of the state, running for a judgeship or being convicted before the general election. Should Grimm be removed from the ballot, potential Republican candidates include former U.S. Representative Vito Fossella, State Senator Andrew Lanza, State Assemblywoman Nicole Malliotakis, State Assemblyman Joseph Borelli, former state assemblyman Matthew Mirones, Richmond County District Attorney and nominee for New York Attorney General in 2010 Daniel M. Donovan, Jr., Staten Island Borough President James Oddo, New York City Council Minority Leader Vincent M. Ignizio and New York City Councilman Steven Matteo. Potential Democratic candidates include State Assemblyman Michael Cusick, former U.S. Representative Michael McMahon, State Senator Diane Savino, New York City Councilwoman Debi Rose and State Assemblyman Matthew Titone.

McMahon considering a rematch against Grimm, but decided against it. Domenic Recchia, a former member of the New York City Council, and Erick Salgado, Pastor of the Church of Iglesia Jovenes Cristianos and candidate for Mayor of New York City in 2013, were running for the Democratic nomination. However, Salgado was removed from the ballot after failing to file enough nominating petition signatures. Recchia thus won the Democratic nomination unopposed.

General election

Polling

Results

District 12

The 12th district is located entirely in New York City and includes several neighborhoods in the East Side of Manhattan, Greenpoint and western Queens. The incumbent is Democrat Carolyn Maloney, who has represented the district since 2013, and previously represented the 14th district from 1993 to 2013. She was re-elected in 2012 with 80% of the vote and the district has a PVI of D+27.

Maloney has received the Democratic and Working Families nominations. Nicholas S. Di Iorio has received the Republican, Conservative and Independence Party nominations.

General election

Results

District 13

The 13th district is located entirely in New York City and includes Upper Manhattan and a small portion of the western Bronx. The incumbent is Democrat Charles B. Rangel, who has represented the district since 2013, after previously representing the 15th district since 1993. The district has a PVI of D+42.

Democratic primary

Polling

Results

General election

Polling

Results

District 14

The 14th district is located in New York City and includes the eastern Bronx and part of north-central Queens. The incumbent is Democrat Joseph Crowley, who has represented the district since 2013, and previously represented the 7th district from 1999 to 2013. He was re-elected in 2012 with 83% of the vote and the district has a PVI of D+26.

Crowley has received the Democratic and Working Families nominations. Elizabeth Perri, a Conservative nominee for the state senate in 2012 and the Republican nominee for Bronx borough president in 2013, has received the Conservative nomination.

General election

Results

District 15

The 15th district is located entirely within The Bronx in New York City and is the smallest district by area in the entire country. The incumbent is Democrat José E. Serrano, who has represented the district since 2013, and previously represented the 16th district from 1993 to 2013 and the 18th district from 1990 to 1993. He was re-elected in 2012 with 97% of the vote and the district has a PVI of D+43.

Serrano has received the Working Families nomination. Eduardo Ramirez, a candidate for the State Assembly in 2012 and the New York City Council in 2013, has received the Conservative nomination. William Edstrom, a candidate for the State Assembly in 2012, has received the Green nomination.

Democratic primary
New York City Councilwoman Annabel Palma had considered challenging Serrano in the primary, but decided against it. Democratic state senator Rubén Díaz, Sr. has also declined to run against Serrano. Chess player and perennial candidate Sam Sloan is running against Serrano in the Democratic primary.

Results

General election

Results

District 16

The 16th district is located in the northern part of The Bronx and the southern half of Westchester County, including the cities of Mount Vernon, Yonkers and Rye. The incumbent is Democrat Eliot Engel, who has represented the district since 2013, and previously represented the 17th district from 1993 to 2013 and the 19th district from 1989 to 1993. He was re-elected in 2012 with 76% of the vote and the district has a PVI of D+21.

Engel has received the nominations of the Democratic and Working Families parties. Patrick A. McManus, a perennial candidate for office, was the Conservative nominee, but the board rejected his petition as invalid, taking him off of the ballot for the primary election. Therefore, Engel is un-opposed for re-election.

General election

Results

District 17

The 17th district contains all of Rockland County and the northern and central portions of Westchester County, including the cities of Peekskill and White Plains. The incumbent is Democrat Nita Lowey, who has represented the district since 2013, and previously represented the 18th district from 1993 to 2013 and the 20th district from 1989 to 1993. She was re-elected in 2012 with 64% of the vote and the district has a PVI of D+5.

Lowey has received the Democratic and Working Families Party nominations. Chris Day, an army veteran of the Afghanistan and Iraq Wars and private equity/venture capital investment professional, is challenging her as the Republican and Conservative Party nominee.  The Independence Party line will not be active in this election after Lowey's ballot access petitions were rejected by the Board of Elections.

General election

Results

District 18

The 18th district is located in the northern suburbs and exurbs of New York City and includes all of Orange and Putnam counties, as well as parts of southern Dutchess and northeastern Westchester counties. The incumbent is Democrat Sean Patrick Maloney, who has represented the district since 2013. He was elected in 2012, defeating Republican incumbent Nan Hayworth with 52% of the vote and the district has an even PVI.

Hayworth is seeking a rematch with Maloney. State Senator Gregory R. Ball declined to seek the Republican nomination, praising Maloney in a statement: "We have a great working relationship and he and his office are to be applauded, for they have bent over backwards to mutually assist shared constituents." He formally endorsed Maloney in September 2014,  praising his work on veterans' issues. Another Republican state senator, Bill Larkin, also cited veterans' issues as the reason for his endorsing Maloney.

Hayworth has received the Republican, Conservative and Independence Party nominations and Maloney has received the Democratic and Working Families Party nominations.

Independence primary

General election

Polling

Results

District 19

The 19th district is located in New York's Hudson Valley and Catskills regions and includes all of Columbia, Delaware, Greene, Otsego, Schoharie, Sullivan and Ulster counties, and parts of Broome, Dutchess, Montgomery and Rensselaer counties. The incumbent is Republican Chris Gibson, who has represented the district since 2013, and previously represented the 20th district from 2011 to 2013. He was re-elected in 2012 with 53% of the vote and the district has a PVI of D+1.

Sean Eldridge, an investment fund president and political activist, has received the Democratic and Working Families nominations and Gibson has received the Republican, Conservative and Independence Party nominations.

General election

Polling

Results

District 20

The 20th district is located in the Capital District and includes all of Albany and Schenectady counties, and portions of Montgomery, Rensselear and Saratoga counties. The incumbent is Democrat Paul Tonko, who has represented the district since 2013, and previously represented the 21st district from 2009 to 2013. He was re-elected in 2012 with 68% of the vote and the district has a PVI of D+7.

Tonko has received the Democratic, Working Families and Independence Party nominations. Businessman Jim Fischer has received the Republican and Conservative Party nominations.

General election

Results

District 21

The 21st district, the state's largest and most rural, includes most of the North Country and borders Vermont to the east. The incumbent was Democrat Bill Owens, who had represented the district since 2013, and previously represented the 23rd district from 2009 to 2013. He was re-elected in 2012 with 50% of the vote and the district has an even PVI.

Owens, who has been in Congress since winning a 2009 special election, announced he would not seek re-election on January 14, 2014.

Democratic primary
For the Democrats, former Republican assemblywoman Dede Scozzafava, chairman of the Essex County Board of Supervisors Randy Douglas, Assemblywoman Addie Jenne Russell, Plattsburgh Town Supervisor Bernie Bassett, director of economic development for Senator Kirsten Gillibrand Jonathan Cardinal, former Oswego Mayor John T. Sullivan, Jr. and former Congressman Scott Murphy all declined to run. Former state senator Darrel Aubertine initially left open the possibility of running but also eventually declined. The Democratic county committee chairs in the district thus nominated Aaron Woolf, a relatively unknown grocery store owner and filmmaker with a home in Elizabethtown, as their nominee at a meeting on February 12, 2014. In response, Macomb town councilman Stephen Burke declared his candidacy, but he was removed from the ballot after he filed insufficient ballot petition signatures. Green candidate Donald Hassig was also removed for the same reason. Woolf has received the Working Families Party nomination.

Candidates
Nominee
 Aaron Woolf, grocery store owner and filmmaker (designated party nominee)

Removed from ballot
 Stephen Burke, Macomb town councilman

Declined
 Darrel Aubertine, former state senator
 Bernie Bassett, Plattsburgh Town Supervisor
 Stuart Brody, former Essex County Demcocratic Chairman
 Jonathan Cardinal, director of economic development for Senator Kirsten Gillibrand
 Randy Douglas, chairman of the Essex County Board of Supervisors
 Lee Kindlon, attorney
 Scott Murphy, former U.S. Representative
 Bill Owens, incumbent U.S. Representative
 Addie Jenne Russell, state assemblywoman
 Dede Scozzafava, former Republican state assemblywoman
 John T. Sullivan, Jr., former Oswego Mayor

Republican primary
The county Republican committees endorsed Elise Stefanik, a former aide in the George W. Bush Administration, as their designated candidate in a meeting on February 7, 2014. Michael Ring, a broadcast engineer and political activist from Jefferson County, and Jamie Waller, a former Marine and political consultant, both initially entered the race but withdrew in March. Former 2012 nominee Matt Doheny entered the race. Actor John James, Warren County District Attorney Kate Hogan, State Senator Betty Little and 2009 and 2010 Conservative Party nominee Doug Hoffman did not run.

Joseph Gilbert, the former emergency services director for St. Lawrence County and a local Tea Party activist, withdrew from the Republican primary on April 11, 2014, due to personal and family problems. He may still run in the general election under the banner of the Constitution Party if he can resolve those problems by June. Doheny and Stefanik also sought the Conservative and Independence Party nominations. Stefanik won the Conservative endorsement and Doheny won the Independence nomination, but after he lost the Republican primary, announced his support for Stefanik. He was eventually removed from the ballot and Stefanik took the Independence Party nomination.

Candidates
Declared
 Matt Doheny, investment fund manager, nominee for the seat in 2012 and nominee for New York's 23rd congressional district in 2010 (defeated in primary)
 Elise Stefanik, former George W. Bush administration aide (designated party nominee; also received Conservative Party nomination); (has received the Independence Party nomination).

Withdrew
 Joe Gilbert, retired army major and Tea Party activist (still in the general election; has received the Constitution Party nomination)
 Michael Ring, broadcast engineer and computer consultant
 Jamie Waller, former Marine and political consultant

Declined
 Doug Hoffman, Conservative Party nominee for New York's 23rd congressional district in 2009 and Republican candidate for the seat in 2010
 Kate Hogan, Warren County District Attorney
 John James, actor
 Betty Little, state senator
 Paul Maroun, mayor of Tupper Lake and Franklin County Legislator

Endorsements

Polling

Results

Green primary

Candidates
Declared
 Matt Funicello, bakery owner and political activist

Removed from ballot
 Donald Hassig, environmental activist and nominee for the seat in 2012

General election

Polling

 ^ Internal poll for the Matt Doheny campaign

Results

District 22

The 22nd district is located in Central New York and includes all of Chenango, Cortland, Madison and Oneida counties, and parts of Broome, Herkimer, Oswego and Tioga counties.

Republican primary
The incumbent is Republican Richard L. Hanna, who has represented the district since 2013, and previously represented the 24th district from 2011 to 2013. He was re-elected in 2012 with 61% of the vote and the district has a PVI of R+3.

Republican state assemblywoman Claudia Tenney ran against Hanna in the Republican primary, but Hanna defeated Tenney in the primary election. No Democrat filed to run for the seat. Hanna has also received the Conservative and Independence Party nominations as well.

Results

General election

Polling

Results

District 23

The 23rd district includes all of Allegany, Cattaraugus, Chautauqua, Chemung, Schuyler, Seneca, Steuben, Tompkins and Yates counties, along with parts of Ontario and Tioga counties. The incumbent is Republican Tom Reed, who has represented the district since 2013, and previously represented the 29th district from 2009 to 2013. He was re-elected in 2012 with 52% of the vote and the district has a PVI of R+3.

Reed has received the Republican, Conservative and Independence Party nominations. Democrat Martha Robertson, the chairman of the Tompkins County legislature, has received the Democratic and Working Families Party nominations.

General election

Polling

Results

District 24

The 24th district includes all of Cayuga, Onondaga and Wayne counties, and the western part of Oswego County. The incumbent is Democrat Dan Maffei, who has represented the district since 2013, and previously represented the 25th district from 2009 to 2011. He was re-elected in 2012 with 49% of the vote, defeating Republican incumbent Ann Marie Buerkle, who had beaten Maffei in 2010. The district has a PVI of D+5.

Maffei has received the Democratic and Working Families Party nominations. Buerkle initially considered challenging Maffei again in 2014, but declined to run in September 2013. Instead, the Republicans endorsed U.S. Attorney John Katko. Retired Army Lieutenant Colonel John Lemondes had considered running against Katko in the Republican primary, but decided against it. Katko also has the Conservative and Independence Party nominations.

General election

Polling

Results

District 25

The 25th district located entirely within Monroe County, centered on the city of Rochester. The incumbent is Democrat Louise Slaughter, who has represented the district since 2013, and previously represented the 28th district from 1993 to 2013 and the 30th district from 1987 to 1993. She was re-elected in 2012 with 57% of the vote and the district has a PVI of D+7.

Due to Slaughter's age and recent health problems, there was speculation that she might retire, with Rochester Mayor Lovely A. Warren considered likely to run for the Democrats. On January 15, 2014, Slaughter confirmed that she was running again. She has received the Democratic and Working Families nominations.

Republican Mark Assini, the Town Supervisor of Gates and the Conservative nominee for the seat in 2004, has received the Republican and Conservative Party nominations. Independent Tim Dean is also running.

General election

Results

District 26

The 25th district located in Erie and Niagara counties and includes the cities of Buffalo and Niagara Falls. The incumbent is Democrat Brian Higgins, who has represented the district since 2013, and previously represented the 27th district from 2005 to 2013. He was re-elected in 2012 with 75% of the vote and the district has a PVI of D+12.

Higgins has received the Democratic and Working Families Party nominations. Kathy Weppner, a former talk radio host, has received the Republican and Conservative Party nominations.

General election

Results

District 27

The 27th district is located in Western New York and includes all of Orleans, Genesee, Wyoming and Livingston counties, and parts of Erie, Monroe, Niagara and Ontario counties. The incumbent is Republican Chris Collins, who has represented the district since 2013. He was elected in 2012, defeating Democratic incumbent Kathy Hochul with 51% of the vote. The district has a PVI of R+8.

Collins received the Republican, Conservative and Independence Party nominations. Hochul ran for Lieutenant Governor of New York in 2014. Jim O'Donnell, a Buffalo police officer, received the Democratic and Working Families Party nominations.

General election

Results

See also

 2014 United States House of Representatives elections
 2014 United States elections

References

External links
U.S. House elections in New York, 2014 at Ballotpedia
Campaign contributions at OpenSecrets

New York
2014
United States House of Representatives